Wed 21 is the sixth studio album by Argentine singer and songwriter Juana Molina. It was released on 28 October 2013 by Crammed Discs. From 2009 to 2012, Molina worked on the album on her own, recording at her house in Buenos Aires. Musically, Wed 21 is a folktronica album with a sound similar to her previous releases, but with innovations like the use of bass, drums, many electric guitars, noise, a horn and more detailed electronics, which led the Argentine Rolling Stone to describe it as her most "rocker" album. The album received rave reviews from music critics, who noted it was not a departure from her distinctive sound but still a progression.

The title came from the name of a track recorded on 21 November, which didn't ever get a name.

Track listing
"Eras" (You Were) – 4:25
"Wed 21" – 3:18
"Ferocísimo" (The Most Ferocious) – 3:23
"Lo Decidí Yo" (I Decided It) – 4:06
"Sin Guía, No" (Not Without a Guide) – 4:52
"Ay, No Se Ofendan" (Oh, Don't Get Offended) – 5:30
"Bicho Auto" (Bug Car) – 4:34
"El Oso de la Guarda" (The Guardian Bear) – 6:39
"Las Edades" (Ages) – 4:17
"La Rata" (The Rat) – 4:18
"Final Feliz" (Happy Ending) – 3:47
"De Algún Instinto Animal" (By Some Animal Instinct) – 4:03

References

2013 albums
Juana Molina albums